Džengis Čavušević (born 26 November 1987) is a retired Slovenian footballer who played as a striker.

Career
Čavušević moved to St. Gallen after playing three seasons for Wil 1900 in the Swiss Challenge League. In July 2016 he signed a two-year contract with FC Zürich. In December 2017 the contract was terminated by mutual consent.

On 6 February 2018, Čavušević joined Australian club Adelaide United until the end of the season. Not long into his time at Adelaide, he suffered a ruptured anterior cruciate ligament (ACL). He was released at the end of the season and subsequently retired from professional football.

Career statistics

Honours
Slovenian PrvaLiga: 2006–07, 2007–08

References

External links

NZS profile 

1987 births
Living people
Footballers from Ljubljana
Slovenian footballers
Association football forwards
NK Domžale players
Slovenian expatriate footballers
Expatriate footballers in Switzerland
Slovenian expatriate sportspeople in Switzerland
Expatriate soccer players in Australia
Slovenian expatriate sportspeople in Australia
FC Wil players
FC St. Gallen players
FC Zürich players
Adelaide United FC players
Slovenian PrvaLiga players
Swiss Super League players
Swiss Challenge League players
A-League Men players
Slovenia international footballers
Slovenian football managers